"Salé" is a 2017 song by French rapper Niska. Its music video has over 192 million views.

Charts

Weekly charts

Certifications

References

2017 singles
2017 songs
Niska (rapper) songs
French-language songs